Swapnajaal is a 2018 Bangladeshi dramatic and romantic movie written and directed by Giasuddin Selim.

Introduction
A film from the highly acclaimed director of Monpura, where starring most popular actress Pori Moni. The story of the film about the love of a young couple.

Kamrul Hasan Khasru's cinematography is all but flawless, and the art direction (by Anworul Haque and Samar Halder) is also commendable, especially in the latter part of the film.

Set in the riverside Chandpur suburbs of the '90s, “Swapnajaal” at its core is the story of Opu (Yash Rohan) and Shuvra (Pori Moni), two teenagers in 'young love'. Their blooming romance take a dramatic turn south when conniving influential businessman Aynal Gazi (Fazlur Rahman Babu), with the help of his trusted aide Thandu (Iresh Zaker) tactfully oust Shuvra and her family from their home. Opu fights back to bring justice to Shuvra's family and to get back his love, but even after justice is served, there are bigger obstacles on the way to their reunion.

Cast
 Yash Rohan as Apu
 Pori Moni as Shuvra
 Fazlur Rahman Babu as Aynal Gazi
 Misha Sawdagar as Hiran Saha
 Shahidul Alam Sachchu as Rahman Miah
 Munia Islam as Julekha
 Iresh Jaker as Thandu

Music

Playback singer
 Luva Nabid Chowdhury
 Kazi Krishnokoli Islam
 Laisa Ahmed Lisa

References

External links
 
 
 

Bengali-language Bangladeshi films
2010s Bengali-language films
Love trilogy (film series)
2018 films
2018 romantic drama films